Camp d'Esports is a neighborhood in Lleida, Catalonia, Spain. As  of 2009, it had 4,850 inhabitants. It is named after the Camp d'Esports football stadium located in the area and it is bordered (clockwise starting from the northeast) by the neighborhoods of Príncep de Viana-Clot, Xalets-Humbert Torres, Universitat, Joc de la Bola and Ciutat Jardí-Les Valls.

See also
Neighborhoods of Lleida

References

Neighbourhoods of Lleida
Lleida